Labyrinth is the sixth studio album released by the multi-genre electronic/trance group Juno Reactor.

Overview
The album contains several pieces that hold various forms of sound ranging from orchestral, industrial, and techno as well as containing Juno Reactor's trademark tribal sound (possibly as best featured in Conquistador II). The album also features two songs from Watkins' collaboration with The Matrix composer Don Davis on the films The Matrix Reloaded and The Matrix Revolutions, "Mona Lisa Overdrive" (from Reloaded) and "Navras" (from Revolutions). The version of "Mona Lisa Overdrive" is different from that featured on the film's soundtrack. It is shortened from its original time of 10:08 to 4:45 and there are easily noticeable differences in the sound of the bass and tone of the songs. "Navras" is a remix of Davis' song "Neodämmerung" (German for "The Twilight of Neo") that was played over the end credits of The Matrix Revolutions. One known single of "Zwara" was released in Japan on November 26, 2003 as a promo.

Track listing

Personnel

Musicians

 Taz Alexander – vocals
 Azam Ali – vocals
 Budgie – drums
 Nick Burton – percussion, drum editing
 Don Davis – orchestration and conductor
 Calina De La Mare – violin
 Greg Ellis – percussion, drums
 Mike Fisher – percussion
 Gocoo – Taiko drums
 Hollywood Film Chorale – choir, chorus
 Greg Hunter – engineering, bass guitar, mixing
 Victor Indrizzo – drums
 Susan Hendricks – vocals
 Risenga Makondo – percussion
 Simpiwe Matole – percussion
 Xavier Morel – sonic forager
 Eduardo Niebla – guitar
 Deepak Ram – vocals, flute
 Scarlet – guitar
 Lakshmi Shankar – vocals
 Mabi Thobejane – percussion, vocals
 Tigram – ney
 Youth – bass guitar

Production

 Juno Reactor – production
 Toto Annihilation – engineering
 Zig Gron – music editor
 Adam Wren – mixing
 Simon Watkins – album art/photography
 Scott Oyster – engineering
 Kevin Metcalfe – mastering

Trivia
 Track "Angels and Men" used in the "Dimension Bomb" animation from Genius Party Beyond.
 Track "Mona Lisa Overdrive" was produced with Don Davis, the composer for The Matrix series, and was used for the highway chase scene in The Matrix: Reloaded.

References
 JunoReactor.com profile of Labyrinth

External links
ReactorLeak.com profile of Labyrinth
Review of the album on about.com
Review of the album on side-line.com
[ Review of the album on allmusic.com]

2004 albums
Juno Reactor albums
Trance albums